The 2012 League of Ireland Premier Division was the 28th season of the League of Ireland Premier Division. The division featured 12 teams. Sligo Rovers were champions, winning their first top league title since 1976–77. Drogheda United finished as runners-up.

Teams

Stadia and locations

Personnel and kits

Managerial changes

Overview
There was a mid-season break coinciding with the Republic of Ireland national football team's UEFA Euro 2012 finals campaign. On 18 June 2012, Monaghan United announced their withdrawal from the league. Their record was subsequently expunged. The Premier Division title was won by Sligo Rovers, their first title in thirty five years.

Final table

Results

Matches 1–22

Matches 23–33

Promotion/relegation play-off
Dundalk, the eleventh placed team from the Premier Division, played Waterford United, the winner of the First Division play-off. The winner of this play off would play in the 2013 Premier Division. 

Dundalk win 4–2 on aggregate and retained their place in the Premier Division. Waterford United appealed the result of the playoff, claiming Michael Rafter was ineligible as Dundalk had incorrectly registered him when they signed him earlier that season. However the appeal was unsuccessful.

Awards

Top scorers

Player of the Month

See also
 2012 League of Ireland First Division
 2012 League of Ireland Cup

Notes

References

 
League of Ireland Premier Division seasons
1
1
Ireland
Ireland